A certificate of deposit (CD) is a time deposit, a financial product commonly sold by banks, thrift institutions, and credit unions in the United States. CDs differ from savings accounts in that the CD has a specific, fixed term (often one, three, or six months, or one to five years) and usually, a fixed interest rate. The bank expects the CD to be held until maturity, at which time they can be withdrawn and interest paid.

Like savings accounts, CDs are insured "money in the bank" (in the US up to $250,000) and thus, up to the local insured deposit limit, virtually risk free. In the US, CDs are insured by the Federal Deposit Insurance Corporation (FDIC) for banks and by the National Credit Union Administration (NCUA) for credit unions.

In exchange for the customer depositing the money for an agreed term, institutions usually offer higher interest rates than they do on accounts that customers can withdraw from on demand—though this may not be the case in an inverted yield curve situation. Fixed rates are common, but some institutions offer CDs with various forms of variable rates. For example, in mid-2004, interest rates were expected to rise—and many banks and credit unions began to offer CDs with a "bump-up" feature. These allow for a single readjustment of the interest rate, at a time of the consumer's choosing, during the term of the CD. Sometimes, financial institutions introduce CDs indexed to the stock market, bond market, or other indices.

Some features of CDs are:
 A larger principal should/may receive a higher interest rate.
 A longer term usually earns a higher interest rate, except in the case of an inverted yield curve (e.g.,  preceding a recession).
 Smaller institutions tend to offer higher interest rates than larger ones.
 Personal CD accounts generally receive higher interest rates than business CD accounts.
 Banks and credit unions that are not insured by the FDIC or NCUA generally offer higher interest rates.

CDs typically require a minimum deposit, and may offer higher rates for larger deposits. The best rates are generally offered on "Jumbo CDs" with minimum deposits of $100,000. Jumbo CDs are commonly bought by large institutional investors, such as banks and pension funds, that are interested in low-risk and stable investment options. Jumbo CDs are also known as negotiable certificates of deposits and come in bearer form. These work like conventional certificate of deposits that lock in the principal amount for a set timeframe and are payable upon maturity.

The consumer who opens a CD may receive a paper certificate, but it is now common for a CD to consist simply of a book entry and an item shown in the consumer's periodic bank statements. That is, there is often no "certificate" as such. Consumers who want a hard copy that verifies their CD purchase may request a paper statement from the bank, or print out their own from the financial institution's online banking service.

Closure 

Withdrawals before maturity are usually subject to a substantial penalty. For a five-year CD, this is often the loss of up to twelve months' interest. These penalties ensure that it is generally not in a holder's best interest to withdraw the money before maturity—unless the holder has another investment with significantly higher return or has a serious need for the money.

Commonly, institutions mail a notice to the CD holder shortly before the CD matures requesting directions. The notice usually offers the choice of withdrawing the principal and accumulated interest or "rolling it over" (depositing it into a new CD). Generally, a "window" is allowed after maturity where the CD holder can cash in the CD without penalty. In the absence of such directions, it is common for the institution to roll over the CD automatically, once again tying up the money for a period of time (though the CD holder may be able to specify at the time the CD is opened not to roll over the CD).

Refinancing 

The Truth in Savings Regulation DD requires that insured CDs state, at time of account opening, the penalty for early withdrawal. It is generally accepted that these penalties cannot be revised by the depository prior to maturity.  However, there have been cases in which a credit union modified its early withdrawal penalty and made it retroactive on existing accounts. The second occurrence happened when Main Street Bank of Texas closed a group of CDs early without full payment of interest. The bank claimed the disclosures allowed them to do so.

The penalty for early withdrawal deters depositors from taking advantage of subsequent better investment opportunities during the term of the CD. In rising interest rate environments, the penalty may be insufficient to discourage depositors from redeeming their deposit and reinvesting the proceeds after paying the applicable early withdrawal penalty. Added interest from the new higher yielding CD may more than offset the cost of the early withdrawal penalty.

Ladders 

While longer investment terms yield higher interest rates, longer terms also may result in a loss of opportunity to lock in higher interest rates in a rising-rate economy. A common mitigation strategy for this opportunity cost is the "CD ladder" strategy. In the ladder strategies, the investor distributes the deposits over a period of several years with the goal of having all one's money deposited at the longest term (and therefore the higher rate) but in a way that part of it matures annually. In this way, the depositor reaps the benefits of the longest-term rates while retaining the option to re-invest or withdraw the money in shorter-term intervals.

For example, an investor beginning a three-year ladder strategy starts by depositing equal amounts of money each into a 3-year CD, 2-year CD, and 1-year CD. From that point on, a CD reaches maturity every year, at which time the investor can re-invest at a 3-year term. After two years of this cycle, the investor has all money deposited at a three-year rate, yet have one-third of the deposits mature every year (which the investor can then reinvest, augment, or withdraw).

The responsibility for maintaining the ladder falls on the depositor, not the financial institution. Because the ladder does not depend on the financial institution, depositors are free to distribute a ladder strategy across more than one bank. This can be advantageous, as smaller banks may not offer the longer terms of some larger banks. Although laddering is most common with CDs, investors may use this strategy on any time deposit account with similar terms.

Step-up callable CD 
Step-Up Callable CDs are a form of CD where the interest rate increases multiple times prior to maturity of the CD. These CDs are often issued with maturities up to 15 years, with a step-up in interest happening at year 5 and year 10.

Typically, the beginning interest rate is higher than what is available on shorter-maturity CDs, and the rate increases with each step-up period.

These CDs have a “call” feature which allows the issuer to return the deposit to the investor after a specified period of time, which is usually at least a year. When the CD is called, the investor is given back their deposit and they will no longer receive any future interest payments.

Because of the call feature, interest rate risk is borne by the investor, rather than the issuer. This transfer of risk allows Step-Up Callable CDs to offer a higher interest rate than currently available from non-callable CDs. If prevailing interest rates decline, the issuer will call the CD and re-issue debt at a lower interest rate. If the CD is called before maturity, the investor is faced with reinvestment risk. If prevailing interest rates increase, the issuer will allow the CD to go to maturity.

Deposit insurance 
The amount of insurance coverage varies, depending on how accounts for an individual or family are structured at the institution. The level of insurance is governed by complex FDIC and NCUA rules, available in FDIC and NCUA booklets or online. The standard insurance coverage is currently $250,000 per owner or depositor for single accounts or $250,000 per co-owner for joint accounts.

Some institutions use a private insurance company instead of, or in addition to, the federally backed FDIC or NCUA deposit insurance. Institutions often stop using private supplemental insurance when they find that few customers have a high enough balance level to justify the additional cost. The Certificate of Deposit Account Registry Service program lets investors keep up to $50 million invested in CDs managed through one bank with full FDIC insurance. However rates will likely not be the highest available.

Terms and conditions 
There are many variations in the terms and conditions for CDs

The federally required "Truth in Savings" booklet, or other disclosure document that gives the terms of the CD, must be made available before the purchase. Employees of the institution are generally not familiar with this information; only the written document carries legal weight. If the original issuing institution has merged with another institution, or if the CD is closed early by the purchaser, or there is some other issue, the purchaser will need to refer to the terms and conditions document to ensure that the withdrawal is processed following the original terms of the contract.
The terms and conditions may be changeable. They may contain language such as "We can add to, delete or make any other changes ("Changes") we want to these Terms at any time."
The CD may be callable. The terms may state that the bank or credit union can close the CD before the term ends.
Payment of interest. Interest may be paid out as it is accrued or it may accumulate in the CD.
Interest calculation. The CD may start earning interest from the date of deposit or from the start of the next month or quarter.
Right to delay withdrawals. Institutions generally have the right to delay withdrawals for a specified period to stop a bank run.
Withdrawal of principal. May be at the discretion of the financial institution. Withdrawal of principal below a certain minimum—or any withdrawal of principal at all—may require closure of the entire CD. A US Individual Retirement Account CD may allow withdrawal of IRA Required Minimum Distributions without a withdrawal penalty.
Withdrawal of interest.  May be limited to the most recent interest payment or allow for withdrawal of accumulated total interest since the CD was opened. Interest may be calculated to date of withdrawal or through the end of the last month or last quarter.
Penalty for early withdrawal. May be measured in months of interest, may be calculated to be equal to the institution's current cost of replacing the money, or may use another formula. May or may not reduce the principal—for example, if principal is withdrawn three months after opening a CD with a six-month penalty.
Fees. A fee may be specified for withdrawal or closure or for providing a certified check.
Automatic renewal. The institution may or may not commit to sending a notice before automatic rollover at CD maturity. The institution may specify a grace period before automatically rolling over the CD to a new CD at maturity. Some banks have been known to renew at rates lower than that of the original CD.

Criticism 
There may be some correlation between CD interest rates and inflation. For example, in one situation interest rates might be 15% and inflation 15%, and in another situation interest rates might be 2% and inflation may be 2%. Of course, these factors cancel out, so the real interest rate, which indicates the maintenance or otherwise of value, is both zero in these two examples.

However the real rates of return offered by CDs, as with other fixed interest instruments, can vary a lot. For example, during a credit crunch banks are in dire need of funds, and CD interest rate increases may not track inflation.

The above does not include taxes. When taxes are considered, the higher-rate situation above is worse, with a lower (more negative) real return, although the before-tax real rates of return are identical. The after-inflation, after-tax return is what is important.

Author Ric Edelman writes: "You don't make any money in bank accounts (in real economic terms), simply because you're not supposed to." On the other hand, he says, bank accounts and CDs are fine for holding cash for a short amount of time.

Even to the extent that CD rates are correlated with inflation, this can only be the expected inflation at the time the CD is bought. The actual inflation will be lower or higher. Locking in the interest rate for a long term may be bad (if inflation goes up) or good (if inflation goes down). For example, in the 1970s, inflation increased higher than it had been, and this was not fully reflected in interest rates. This is particularly important for longer-term notes, where the interest rate is locked in for some time. This gave rise to amusing nicknames for CDs. A little later, the opposite happened, and inflation declined.

In general, and in common with other fixed interest investments, the economic value of a CD rises when market interest rates fall, and vice versa.

Some banks pay lower than average rates, while others pay higher rates. In the United States, depositors can take advantage of the best FDIC-insured rates without increasing their risk.

As with other types of investment, investors should be suspicious of a CD offering an unusually high rate of return. For example Allen Stanford used fraudulent CDs with high rates to lure people into his Ponzi scheme.

References

External links 
The US SEC on buying CDs
North American Securities Administrators Association on buying CDs.
2008 US SEC Litigation Release   "...a scheme to defraud investors, many of them elderly, of approximately $3,661,248 by selling the investors fraudulent certificates of deposit."
Liberty Bank for Savings on CD Laddering

Bank deposits
Retail financial services
Interest-bearing instruments
Money market instruments
Investment in the United States